The Men's individual pursuit CP Div 3 track cycling event at the 2004 Summer Paralympics was competed from 19 to 20 September. It was won by Darren Kenny, representing .

Qualifying

19 Sept. 2004, 10:50

Final round

Gold
20 Sept. 2004, 14:15

Bronze

References

M